Jenny Tamas (born 18 January 1990) is a German ice hockey player. She competed in the women's tournament at the 2006 Winter Olympics. She was the youngest player on the German ice hockey team at age 16.

References

External links
 

1990 births
Living people
German women's ice hockey players
Olympic ice hockey players of Germany
Ice hockey players at the 2006 Winter Olympics
People from Herford
Sportspeople from Detmold (region)
21st-century German women